is a Japanese manga series adapted from the comedic Jeeves short stories written by English humourist P. G. Wodehouse. The original stories were translated into Japanese by Tamaki Morimura and illustrated by Bun Katsuta. Please, Jeeves was serialized in Hakusensha's  (girls') manga magazine Melody from 2008 to 2014 and published in five volumes.

The series stars the amiable and naive young gentleman Bertie Wooster and his brilliant valet Jeeves. Each chapter of the manga adapts one or two short stories, giving the series an episodic structure, with each chapter being a complete story.

Development

In the years leading up to the creation of Please, Jeeves, butlers became a popular topic for manga, with one example being the comic character Hayate the Combat Butler. Sometime in 2007, Maki Shiraoka, a senior editor for Hakusensha, conceived of the idea of a manga series featuring Jeeves and Bertie Wooster. She discussed this idea with another Hakusensha editor, Ayaka Tokushige, who found Tamaki Morimura's translation of The Inimitable Jeeves and believed it would be a good basis for a manga. They planned to serialize the stories in the bimonthly  (girls') manga magazine Melody and then release the stories as a single volume at the end of the year. After searching for an artist, they chose Bun Katsuta, who is known for her "retro" style.

Early in 2008, while working on adapting Wodehouse's stories into manga form, Bun Katsuta and Tamaki Morimura realised that they needed to know more details about 1920s–30s London, such as what a ten-pound note looked like. They visited London and the nearby countryside together for research and studied English stately homes, shops, and architecture, guided by Wodehouse experts. Editors Maki Shiraoka and Ayaka Tokushige were also part of the tour. The first Please, Jeeves story was published in the April 2008 issue of Melody and was an immediate hit.

Publication

The short stories adapted for Please, Jeeves were originally published between 1919 and 1930. Authorized by the P. G. Wodehouse estate, Please, Jeeves was serialized in the bimonthly manga magazine Melody, published by Hakusensha, between 2008 and 2014. It was also released in five volumes by the same publisher, under the company's Hana to Yume Comics label. The first three volumes, which are numbered as a set with white dust jackets, were published in March 2009, December 2010, and October 2012, respectively. The fourth and fifth volumes are not explicitly numbered, and have a red dust jacket and blue dust jacket respectively, though both are still stated to be part of the "Please, Jeeves Series". They were published in November 2013 and December 2014.

In the manga, Jeeves is called a butler, because the Japanese are not familiar with the word valet.

Volumes

Each volume contains between four and six stories. All five published volumes include the original magazine publication date for each story. The last volume also includes a text translation of the short story "Jeeves Makes an Omelette" with five illustrations.

See also
 List of the Jeeves short stories

References

Hakusensha manga
Josei manga
Adaptations of works by P. G. Wodehouse